Crash Time: Autobahn Pursuit (known in the United Kingdom as Crash Time and in the rest of Europe as Alarm für Cobra 11: Crash Time) is a mission-based driving game released for the PC in 2007 and Xbox 360 in 2008, and a sequel to Alarm für Cobra 11: Nitro. It is based on the German television series Alarm für Cobra 11 – Die Autobahnpolizei, and features several characters from the show working their way through criminal cases set in fictitious versions of the city streets of Cologne, and the autobahn in North Rhine Westphalia. The developers created a "Pathfinder" to ensure that the AI vehicles do not always follow the same path during a pursuit. It was not received well by critics, with graphics and plot being of concern. Four sequels have been released on Xbox 360 and through online content provider Steam.

Gameplay

The player assumes the role of one of several officers in the fictional Cobra 11 team, from the television series Alarm für Cobra 11 – Die Autobahnpolizei, a police unit in Germany assigned to patrol the Autobahn and other road networks. The player usually takes the role of either Chris Ritter or Semir Gerkhan, but there is one early mission (Beginner's Luck) where the player takes the place of a contender. The officers are in charge with stopping and questioning suspects about various criminal activities. The game presents the player with a series of fictional "cases" that need to be solved to progress. The cases themselves are set in 2007.

Development
The game was developed for the Xbox 360 by Synetic and published in North America by Crave Entertainment with a release date of 5 August, 2008. In Europe the game was published by RTL Playtainment, a subsidiary of RTL Television, and was released on 9 May, 2008. The PC version was released on 7 November 2007.

Using an improved version of the Crash Time: Autobahn Pursuit game engine developed for Mercedes-Benz World Racing, Synetic also developed a "pathfinder" system to allow AI controlled vehicles to choose their own route to a destination, so that no two pursuits are the same. According to Andreas Leicht, product manager at Synetic, creating the "pathfinder" system was the most difficult and time-consuming part of the development cycle. The scenery runs at a polygon count of 1,200,000 triangles per scene with a damage model based on physical impulses during a collision, in which the vertex basis is deformed. Also, visual damage to the animated model is triggered if the deformation exceeds specified limits, meaning that the cars not only deform but that parts can break and fall off.

City design for the game was based on real-life architecture using industrial buildings, inner-city districts and railway stations as models, although the game does not contain an entire real city. The development team sourced several thousand photos, texture DVDs as well as researching books and videos to obtain a "real" look for the cities.

Reception

The IGN Xbox Team rated Crash Time: Autobahn Pursuit as one of the five worst driving games on Xbox 360, mainly referring to the German police setting to the game, and the poor voice acting in the English-language versions. In a review for IGN by Ryan Geddes there was criticism that what could have been an exciting game has been reduced to the mundane. The difficulty curve was labelled "inconsistent", with "cakewalk levels being followed immediately by nearly impossible ones". The "Cases" mode was criticised as the player cannot tell how many missions are left until the case is completed, making the planning of a game session impossible. The missions have been described as boring and dull.

There was praise for the crashes, and it has been noted that the explosions are poor, but their resulting debris is a nice touch. Francis Clarke of AceGamez stated that the graphics are not acceptable for a modern game with textures not standing up to scrutiny and a clipping effect when driving through fields. There has been criticism that the vehicles in the game pop-up, which is emphasised by the speed at which the player is travelling.

Sequels

Crash Time 2: Burning Wheels
On February 27, 2009, IGN reported that a sequel to Crash Time: Autobahn Pursuit is to be released for under the names Crash Time: Burning Wheels in Europe and Crash Time 2 in the United Kingdom. This game will feature more open world environments where the first game is more linear. An overhead map will be included for the first time in the series, as demonstrated in the demo available on Xbox Live Marketplace. New escort missions have been confirmed by the Entertainment Software Rating Board (ESRB), as has the feature that "players can drive onto a field and plow into cows, which shatter into 'cartoony' t-bone steaks upon impact". The ESRB has also commented on mentions of drugs, prostitution and one instance of sexual innuendo in reference to the new escort style missions. Crash Time 2 was released on Xbox 360 in Europe on 27 November 2008, and on Steam on 27 August 2009.  Crash Time 3: Highway Nights
At the 2009 Tokyo Game Show, the trailer for Crash Time III (known as Crash Time: Highway Nights in the US) premiered, This game features over 200 km of roads and over 32 km² of playable environments, and the player has the chance to choose their own way to proceed through missions, for example instead of simply blocking off an opponent the player can choose to immobilise the vehicle in order to complete the mission. The story follows the pursuit and investigation into a terrorist unit. Crash Time 3 features night time missions for the first time in the series. A single player demo was released on Xbox Live Marketplace on 9 December 2009. Crash Time 3'' was released on Steam on 25 November 2009, and on Xbox 360 in Europe on 27 November 2009.
Also available on cloud-based gaming - Onlive

Crash Time 4: The Syndicate
Crash Time 4: The Syndicate was launched in 2010 featuring new gameplay and plot.  Set in the city of Cologne, Crash Time 4 initially impressed with an Xbox 360 demo well received but was marred by negative critic reviews and a delayed-release date outside of Germany. This game is the best selling game in the series.

Crash Time 5: Undercover
Crash Time 5: Undercover was released in late 2012 as a sequel to Crash Time 4. The game has not been released in the US but has been released in Germany.

References

2007 video games
Racing video games
Video games based on Alarm für Cobra 11 – Die Autobahnpolizei
Video games about police officers
Video games developed in Germany
Video games set in 2007
Video games set in Germany
Windows games
Xbox 360 games
Crave Entertainment games